Stenocercus varius, the keeled whorltail iguana, is a species of lizard of the Tropiduridae family. It is found in Ecuador.

References

Stenocercus
Reptiles described in 1885
Reptiles of Ecuador
Endemic fauna of Ecuador
Taxa named by George Albert Boulenger